Barbara Bessette is an American politician who was a member of the Montana House of Representatives in the State of Montana, representing District 24.

Career 
Before being elected to the Montana House of Representatives, Barbara Bessette worked as a Substance Abuse Prevention Specialist at Gateway Prevention in Great Falls, Montana. Ms. Bessette also served as the chair of the Cascade County DUI task force, as well as on numerous coalitions that help to fight substance abuse.

In 2018 she ran unopposed in the Democratic Primary for District 24 of the Montana House of Representatives. In the general election she faced Republican Mike McNamara whom she beat with 52.4 percent of the vote.

References 

Living people
Members of the Montana House of Representatives
Native American state legislators in Montana
Year of birth missing (living people)
21st-century American politicians